Mount Hardison is a mountain in the eastern Great Smoky Mountains, located in the southeastern United States.

Mount Hardison is named for James Archibald Hardison, an original member of the North Carolina State Park Commission.

See also
 Great Smoky Mountains

References 

Hardison
Blue Ridge Mountains
National Natural Landmarks in North Carolina
Mountains of Swain County, North Carolina
Landmarks in North Carolina
Mitchell
Appalachian culture in North Carolina
Blue Ridge National Heritage Area
North American 1000 m summits